Guy F. Crossman (14 June 1915 – 12 June 1989) was a Liberal party member of the House of Commons of Canada. Born and educated in Buctouche, New Brunswick, he was a contractor by career.

He was first elected at the Kent riding in the 1962 general election, then re-elected there in the 1963 and 1965 federal elections. In the 1968 election, he won the Westmorland—Kent electoral district. After serving his final term in the 28th Canadian Parliament, Crossman left the House of Commons and did not campaign in any further federal elections.

Electoral record

References

External links
 

1915 births
1989 deaths
Members of the House of Commons of Canada from New Brunswick
Liberal Party of Canada MPs
People from Bouctouche